is the 11th single by Japanese entertainer Hikaru Nishida. Written by Takashi Matsumoto and Kyōhei Tsutsumi, the single was released on August 7, 1991, by Pony Canyon.

Background and release
As Nishida had gone through three years without a hit song, her music director Kazuhiro Nagaoka had Matsumoto and Tsutsumi compose a song for her, as the duo's collaborative efforts resulted in the early success of Miho Nakayama. "Tokimeite" was used as the theme song of the TBS drama series .

"Tokimeite" peaked at No. 7 on Oricon's weekly singles chart, becoming Nishida's first and only top-10 single. The single also earned her a performance on the 42nd Kōhaku Uta Gassen in 1991, marking her debut on NHK's New Year's Eve special.

Track listing

Charts

References

External links
 
  

1991 singles
1991 songs
Songs with lyrics by Takashi Matsumoto (lyricist)
Songs with music by Kyōhei Tsutsumi
Japanese television drama theme songs
Pony Canyon singles